Lee Joong-ok (born 1979) is a South Korean actor. He is known for his roles in dramas such as Hell Is Other People, Sketch and Hi Bye, Mama!.

Filmography

Film

Television series

Web series

Television shows

Awards and nominations
 2008 25th Daegu Drama Festival Male Actor Award

References

External links 
 
 

1979 births
Living people
21st-century South Korean male actors
South Korean male television actors
South Korean male film actors